Microcosmus sabatieri, commonly called the grooved sea squirt, sea fig, or violet, is a species of tunicates (sea squirts). The species has a rocky-shape appearance. It is mainly found in the Mediterranean Sea.  It is used as food in parts of Europe.

Uses

Three species of Microcosmus are edible presently, M. sabatieri, M. vulgaris, and M. polymorphus (Vafidis 2008).   In the Mediterranean Basin, it is eaten raw, often with an acidic condiment such as lemon juice or vinegar with shallots. It has a strong iodine taste which not all appreciate.

Names
The specific epithet sabatieri is in honor of zoologist Armand Sabatier.  The name 'violet' is from the distinguishing violet stripes on the siphon.

The species has many common names. In Ligurian it can be called  (sea turds). In Morocco, in both Moroccan Darija and Berber, it's called fezḍaḍ (فزضاض) or afezḍaḍ (ⴰⴼⴻⵣⴹⴰⴹ, أفزضاض).

Other names it is sold under include:
viourlet
bijut/bichu
carnummole (Campania)
morsko jaje (lit. "sea egg"; Croatia)
taratufi (Apulia)

Note that plants of the genus Carpobrotus are also known as 'sea figs'.

Gallery

References

External links

 Microcosmus sabatieri Picture

Stolidobranchia
Taxa named by Louis Roule
Animals described in 1885